Stefano Simoncelli (12 November 1946 – 20 March 2013) was an Italian fencer. He won a silver medal in the team foil event at the 1976 Summer Olympics.

He was later a teacher in Frascati Scherma. He became vice president of Federazione Italiana Scherma.

References

1946 births
2013 deaths
Italian male fencers
Olympic fencers of Italy
Fencers at the 1972 Summer Olympics
Fencers at the 1976 Summer Olympics
Fencers from Rome
Olympic silver medalists for Italy
Olympic medalists in fencing
Medalists at the 1976 Summer Olympics
Universiade medalists in fencing
Universiade bronze medalists for Italy
Medalists at the 1973 Summer Universiade